Arthur Howard (born Arthur John Steiner; 18 January 1910 – 18 June 1995) was an English stage, film and television actor.

Life and career
Born in Camberwell, London, Howard was the younger son of Lilian (née Blumberg) and Ferdinand "Frank" Steiner. His brother was the film actor Leslie Howard and his sister the casting director Irene Howard. He married the actress Jean Compton Mackenzie (a daughter of the actor Frank Compton) in 1936 and they had a son together, the stage actor Alan Howard.

Arthur appeared in several television programmes such as Whack-O, a school comedy in which he played the hapless assistant headmaster Pettigrew to Jimmy Edwards's headmaster, and he was in the 1960 film version Bottoms Up. He appeared in many films, including American Friends and The Magnificent Seven Deadly Sins, and had the small role of Cavendish in the James Bond film Moonraker.

In 1961 he was arrested for importuning and spent a week in prison. He died in Westminster, London. He is buried in the East London Cemetery.

Filmography

 The Private Life of Henry VIII (1933) – Kitchen Helper (uncredited)
 The Lady Is Willing (1934) – Dr. Germont
 Frieda (1947) – First Official
 So Well Remembered (1947) – Politician (uncredited)
 The Mark of Cain (1947) – Clerk of the Court (uncredited)
 London Belongs to Me (1948) – Mr. Chinkwell
 The Passionate Friends (1949) – Smith – the Butler
 Passport to Pimlico (1949) – Bassett
 Private Angelo (1949) – (uncredited)
 Stage Fright (1950) – Groves – Charlotte's Butler (uncredited)
 The Happiest Days of Your Life (1950) – Anthony Ramsden
 Last Holiday (1950) – Burden
 State Secret (1950) – Clubman
 Cage of Gold (1950) – Registry office bridegroom (uncredited)
 Dick Barton at Bay (1950) – Minor Role (uncredited)
 Emergency Wedding (1950) – Minor Role (uncredited)
 Laughter in Paradise (1951) – Businessman on train (uncredited)
 The Man in the White Suit (1951) – Roberts
 Lady Godiva Rides Again (1951) – Soap publicity man
 Never Look Back (1952) – Charles Vaughan
 Moulin Rouge (1952) – Dancing Master (uncredited)
 Cosh Boy (1953) – Registrar (uncredited)
 The Story of Gilbert and Sullivan (1953) – Usher in 'Trial by Jury'
 Grand National Night (1953) – Hotel Manager
 Glad Tidings (1953) – Mr. George Boddington
 Will Any Gentleman...? (1953) – Mr. Coding
 The Intruder (1953) – Bertram Slake
 Monsieur Ripois (1954) – Priest (uncredited)
 The Belles of St. Trinian's (1954) – Wilfred Woodley
 Out of the Clouds (1955) – Booking Clerk at Heathrow (uncredited)
 The Glass Cage (1955) – Rutland
 The Constant Husband (1955) – Clerk of the court
 The Dam Busters (1955) – RAF Pay Clerk in NAAFI (uncredited)
 Footsteps in the Fog (1955) – Vicar
 One Way Out (1955) – Marriott
 Touch and Go (1955) – Man at the Window
 The Adventures of Quentin Durward (1955) – Injured Priest (uncredited)
 One Wish Too Many (1956) – Headmaster
 I Accuse! (1958) – Capt. Lauth
 Law and Disorder (1958) – Burrows
 I Only Arsked! (1958) – Sir Redvers
 Nowhere to Go (1958) – First Mr. Dodds (uncredited)
 Rockets Galore! (1958) – Meeching
 Libel (1959) – Car Salesman
 Friends and Neighbours (1959) – Rev. Dobson
 Desert Mice (1959) – Navy Doctor (uncredited)
 Bottoms Up (1960) – Oliver Pettigrew
 Watch it, Sailor! (1961) – Vicar (guest appearance)
 Paradisio (1961) – Professor Sims
 Kill or Cure (1962) – Green Glades Desk Clerk
 The V.I.P.s (1963) – Bar Steward (uncredited)
 Ladies Who Do (1963) – Chauffeur
 Les Félins (1964) – Father Nielson
 The Counterfeit Constable (1964) – Le supporter anglais qui boit du champagne (uncredited)
 You Must Be Joking! (1965) – Cecil
 Lady L (1965) – Butler
 The Ghost Goes Gear (1966) – Vicar
 Grand Prix (1966) – Claude (uncredited)
 The Shoes of the Fisherman (1968) – English Cardinal
 The Best House in London (1969) – Mr. Fortnum
 Hoverbug (1969) – Mr. Watts
 My Lover, My Son (1970) – Judge
 Jane Eyre (1970) – Doctor
 Zeppelin (1971) – Carlyle (uncredited)
 The Magnificent Seven Deadly Sins (1971) – Kenneth (segment "Wrath")
 Blinker's Spy-Spotter (1972) – Professor
 Steptoe and Son (1972) – Vicar
 One of Our Dinosaurs Is Missing (1975) – Thumley
 Las adolescentes (1975) – Headmaster
 The Bawdy Adventures of Tom Jones (1976) – Old Vicar
 Hardcore (1977) – Vicar
 Full Circle (1977) – Mr. Piggott
 The Prisoner of Zenda (1979) – Deacon
 Moonraker (1979) – Cavendish
 The Missionary (1982) – Fermleigh's Butler
 Trail of the Pink Panther (1982) – Arthur, Bruno's butler
 Curse of the Pink Panther (1983) – Arthur
 Another Country (1984) – Waiter
 Ever Decreasing Circles (1987) – Mr. Lazenby
 American Friends (1991) – Voe

Television
Inspector Morley: Late of Scotland Yard (1952) - (Shop Assistant) - ('The Red Flame': episode Two) - (with Dorothy Bramhall; Tucker McGuire; and Johnny Briggs (actor), in Episode 1).

References

External links

 

1910 births
1995 deaths
English male stage actors
English male film actors
English male television actors
Male actors from London
20th-century English male actors
Jewish English male actors
English people of Hungarian-Jewish descent